The Canadian Oath of Allegiance is a promise or declaration of fealty to the Canadian monarch, as personification of the Canadian state, taken, along with other specific oaths of office, by new occupants of various federal and provincial government offices, members of federal, provincial, and municipal police forces, members of the Canadian Armed Forces, and, in some provinces, all lawyers upon admission to the bar. The Oath of Allegiance also makes up the first portion of the Oath of Citizenship, the taking of which is a requirement of obtaining Canadian nationality.

The vow's roots lie in the oath taken in the United Kingdom, the modern form of which was implemented in 1689 by King William II and III and Queen Mary II and was used in Canada prior to Confederation. The Canadian oath was established at that time in the British North America Act, 1867 (now Constitution Act, 1867), meaning that alteration or elimination of the oath for parliamentarians requires a constitutional amendment. The Oath of Allegiance has also been slightly altered and made or removed as a requirement for admission to other offices or positions through Act of Parliament or letters patent, to which proposals have been put forward for further abolishment or modification.

Composition
The present form of the Oath of Allegiance, which derives from that which was, and still is, taken by parliamentarians in the United Kingdom, is:

A person may choose to replace the word swear with affirm, and to omit the phrase so help me God. The oath taker is also given the option of either swearing on a holy book or not.

The oath for senators and members of parliament has stood the same since confederation; according to Section IX.128 of the Constitution Act, 1867: "Every member of the Senate and the House of Commons of Canada shall before taking his Seat therein take and subscribe before the Governor General or some Person authorized by him, and every Member of a Legislative Council or Legislative Assembly of any Province shall before the Lieutenant Governor of the Province or some Person authorized by him, the Oath of Allegiance contained in the Fifth Schedule to the Act." The oath set out in said schedule is: I, [name], do swear, that I will be faithful and bear true Allegiance to Her Majesty Queen Victoria, with the further instruction that "the name of the King or Queen of the United Kingdom of Great Britain and Ireland for the Time being is to be substituted from Time to Time, with Proper Terms of Reference thereto." The oath thus currently reads as follows:

In French, this is:

For those parliamentarians whose religion prohibits the swearing of oaths, there exists a compromise affirmation, first instituted in 1905:

Purpose
The Oath of Allegiance was implemented to acknowledge the supremacy of the reigning monarch of Canada, the giving of faithfulness to whom is a manifestation of a key responsibility central to the Canadian system of government, and serves to "remind individuals taking it of the serious obligations and responsibilities that he or she is assuming." Allegiance is to the "natural person of the King [or Queen, as the case may be]." The King is the highest authority in the Canadian Forces.

Former Premier of Ontario Mike Harris said in 1993: "The oath to the Queen is fundamental to the administration of the law in this country. It signifies that, here in Canada, justice is done—not in the name of the Prime Minister, or the Mayor, or the Police Chief, as in totalitarian nations—but by the people, in the name of the Queen," while James Robertson stated that the oath was the way elected members of parliament—who are assuming positions of public trust—promise to carry out their duties "patriotically, and in the best interests of the country." The Federal Court also expressed that giving allegiance to the sovereign was "a solemn intention to adhere to the symbolic keystone of the Canadian Constitution, thus pledging an acceptance of the whole of our Constitution and national life," though also reflecting: "It may be argued that it strikes at the very heart of democracy to curtail collective opposition and incentive for change by demanding loyalty to a particular political theory."

The relationship between the oath taker and the monarch is a complex one with roots reaching back to historical periods when a monarch ruled and accepted an oath of fealty from his or her subjects. The modern oath remains both fiduciary and reciprocal; mirroring citizens' oaths to the monarch, the sovereign takes the Coronation Oath, wherein he or she promises "to govern the Peoples of... Canada... according to their respective laws and customs." It has been said of this mutual verbal contract: "except through the person of the Queen, Canada cannot take an oath to Canadians in return. It doesn't exist in the sense that it can take an oath. It is fundamental to our tradition of law and freedom that the commitments made by the people are reciprocated by the state. Reciprocal oaths are essential to our Canadian concept of government." For members of the Canadian Forces, the oath to the monarch is "the soldier's code of moral obligation."

Administration of the oath

Crown appointees
The letters patent issued in 1947 by King George VI outline that the Oath of Allegiance must be taken by a newly appointed governor general and stipulate that the oath must be administered by the chief justice or other judge of the Supreme Court of Canada in the presence of members of the King's Privy Council. In the 19th century, the oath was recited by recently commissioned federal viceroys at whatever port they arrived at in Canada. However, the contemporary practice is to swear-in governors general as part of a ceremony in the Senate chamber on Parliament Hill.

New members of the King's Privy Council recite, along with the Oath of Office, a specific oath that contains a variant on the Oath of Allegiance, as administered by the Clerk of the Privy Council, usually in the presence of the governor general at Government House in Ottawa. Twice, however, the oath has been delivered in front of the reigning monarch: In 1967, the year of Canada's centennial, the provincial premiers then in office were sworn in as members of the Privy Council before Elizabeth II in a ceremony on Parliament Hill and, during her tour of Canada to mark the 125th anniversary of Confederation, new appointees to the Privy Council recited the oath before the Queen at her Ottawa residence. The chief justice of the Supreme Court similarly recites the Oath of Allegiance in front of the governor general.

Parliamentarians
The Clerk of the House, or an authorized designate, administers the Oath of Allegiance to both new and returning members of parliament. Failure to take the oath constitutes an absolute bar on sitting or voting in parliament, along with a denial of the associated salary; this does not mean the person ceases to be a member of the house, simply that they cannot sit or participate in it. In 1875, George Turner Orton, member for Wellington Centre, inadvertently failed to swear the oath. Though Orton did eventually take his Oath of Allegiance, the matter was referred to the Select Standing Committee on Privileges and Elections, which found that the votes Orton cast in the house prior to his swearing the oath were rendered invalid. The only way to change this stipulation would be to amend the constitution, though it is not entirely clear whether or not this could be done under the general amending formula (through resolutions of parliament and of the legislatures of at least two-thirds of the provinces having at least 50% of the population), or if it would necessitate the undivided agreement of all the parliamentary houses across Canada, as is required for any constitutional alteration that affects the Crown.

A breach of the oath can also be seen as an act punishable by the denial of the offender's ability to sit in the House of Commons. Actions such as making treasonous comments in a time of war could be considered a break of the oath, as the oath to the monarch is considered an oath to the country, but expressing anti-confederation sentiments is not, so long as the proponent continues to work for their cause within the laws and customs of Canada. Also, the Queen could remain head of any new state formed after secession from Canada.

As early as 1867, this notion was tested; Joseph Howe was an opponent to confederation, but was elected to the House of Commons and took the Oath of Allegiance, after which he continued to work towards dissolving the union. Later, in 1976, members of the sovereigntist Parti Québécois (PQ) were elected to the National Assembly of Quebec; according to press reports, some of those persons swore the oath with their fingers crossed and others later added flippant commentary to their oath, such as "et aussi au Roi de France" ("and also to the King of France") and "Vive la République" ("live the republic!"), or whispered the words "Sa Majesté la Reine Élisabeth II". In 2003, Premier of Quebec Bernard Landry, leader of the PQ, added to the oath "for the duration of the present constitutional order, which will hopefully change one day in a democratic fashion." None of the actions had any effect on the enforcement of the oath itself, however.

Canadian Armed Forces members
Allegiance and loyalty to the monarch, and the manner in which they are expressed, are specifically outlined in the Canadian Armed Forces regulations and subordinate orders. Within the King's Regulations and Orders, it is stipulated that all Canadian citizens or British subjects who enroll in the forces must take the Oath of Allegiance before either a commissioned officer or a justice of the peace.

"I ......... (full name), do swear (or for a solemn affirmation, "solemnly affirm") that I will be faithful and bear true allegiance to His Majesty, King Charles the Third, King of Canada, His heirs and successors according to law. So help me God."

Those who are not Canadian citizens or British subjects must recite a longer oath:

I, [name], do solemnly swear (or affirm) that I will well and truly serve His Majesty, King Charles the Third, King of Canada, His heirs and successors according to law, in the Canadian Forces until lawfully released, that I will resist His Majesty's enemies and cause His Majesty's peace to be kept and maintained and that I will, in all matters pertaining to my service, faithfully discharge my duty. So help me God.

The words so help me God are omitted if a solemn affirmation is taken.

Those desiring to take the oath

Anyone who desires to swear or affirm allegiance to The King may, while in Canada, do so before a Justice of the peace, under the terms of the Oaths of Allegiance Act, R.S.C., 1985, c. O-1, to wit:

I, ...................., do swear that I will be faithful and bear true allegiance to His Majesty King Charles the Third, King of Canada, His Heirs and Successors. So help me God.  
...  

7 All justices of the peace and other officers lawfully authorized either by virtue of their office or by special commission from the Crown may administer the oath of allegiance set out in section 2 or receive a solemn affirmation of allegiance.

Those required to take the oath
The following persons must take the Oath of Allegiance before occupying a governmental, military, police, or judicial post. Generally, these individuals are appointed by the monarch or relevant viceroy, meaning they serve at His Majesty's pleasure, and are charged with creating or administering the law.

Federal
 Governors general of Canada
 Members of the King's Privy Council for Canada
 Senators
 Members of parliament
 Clerk of the House of Commons
 Justices of the Supreme Court of Canada
 Justices of the Federal Court of Appeal
 Justices of the Federal Court
 Justice of the Tax Court of Canada
 Citizenship Judges
 All employees of the Canadian Security Intelligence Service
 Recruits of the Canadian Armed Forces
 Members of the Royal Canadian Mounted Police
 Officers of the Canada Border Services Agency
 Locally engaged staff at Canada's foreign missions who are Canadian citizens 
Employees of Correctional Service Canada

Provincial
 Lieutenant governors
 Members of a legislature (MLAs, MPPs, MNAs, and MHAs)
 Justices of the appellate courts, superior courts, and provincial courts
 Justices of the Peace in British Columbia
 Auditor General of Ontario
 Staff of the civil service in Ontario, British Columbia, and Manitoba 
 All other Crown appointees in Ontario
 All police officers, railway constables, special constables, and reserve and auxiliary constables in British Columbia
 All police officers, bylaw enforcement officers, and special constables in Nova Scotia
 Community peace officers in the province of Alberta
 All police officers in Saskatchewan, New Brunswick, and Alberta
 Mayors and councillors in Nova Scotia 
 Medical examiners and investigators in Manitoba 
 Sheriffs in Newfoundland and Labrador
 Lawyers in Alberta, Newfoundland and Labrador, Manitoba, and Prince Edward Island
 Notaries public in Newfoundland and Labrador

Territorial
 Commissioners and deputy commissioners of the territories of Yukon, Northwest Territories, and Nunavut.
 Members of the Executive Council of Nunavut
 Members of the Legislative Assemblies of Nunavut and Yukon
 Mayors, municipal councilors, and alderman of Yukon  
 Coroners of Yukon  
 Lawyers in Northwest Territories and Nunavut

Other
 Board members of a regional district in British Columbia
 Lawyers in Ontario, Nova Scotia, New Brunswick, and Yukon
 Police officers, special constables, and auxiliary constables in Ontario
 Mayors and councillors in British Columbia
 School trustees in British Columbia
 Priests and deacons at ordination and Rectors at inductions or installations in certain dioceses of the Anglican Church of Canada.

Opposition and augmentation

Quebec
Early opposition to the Oath of Allegiance was expressed by the inhabitants of Quebec shortly following the transfer of that territory from King Louis XV to King George III via the 1763 Treaty of Paris. The Quebec Act, issued in 1774, subsequently established a special Oath of Allegiance for the Roman Catholics of Quebec that, unlike the one sworn by others, which had remained the same since the reign of Queen Elizabeth I, bore no references to the Protestant faith. It read:

I [name] do sincerely promise and swear, That I will be faithful, and bear true Allegiance to his Majesty King George, and him will defend to the utmost of my Power, against all traitorous Conspiracies, and Attempts whatsoever, which shall be made against his Person. Crown. and Dignity; and I will do my utmost Endeavor to disclose and make known to his Majesty, his Heirs and Successors, all Treasons, and traitorous Conspiracies, and Attempts, which I shall know to be against him, or any of them; and all this I do swear without any Equivocation, mental Evasion, or secret Reservation, and renouncing all Pardons and Dispensations from any Power or Person whomsoever to the contrary. So help me God.

In 1970, the recently elected members of the sovereigntist Parti Québécois (PQ) refused to recite the Oath of Allegiance before taking their seats in the National Assembly of Quebec. At the time, all the other parties in the assembly agreed that the oath was outdated and needed to be amended. The Act Respecting the National Assembly of Quebec was granted Royal Assent in 1982, in which a supplementary oath pledging loyalty to the "people of Quebec" was included. The Members' Manual of the National Assembly outlines that this additional oath is to the people and constitution of Quebec, distinct from the Oath of Allegiance, which is an oath to the country via the Queen, though some saw the monarch, in that context, as representative of the Quebec state and not of Canada, taking into account Canada's "divisible" Crown. Also, Ontario Member of Provincial Parliament (MPP) Dominic Agostino proposed in 1996 that the Legislative Assembly of Ontario follow that of Quebec and add another requisite oath of allegiance to Canada, to be taken by MPPs following the oath to the sovereign. However, the Standing Committee on the Legislative Assembly found that the monarch referred to in the Oath of Allegiance was already the personification of the Canadian state and it was thus redundant to offer allegiance to both the Queen and to Canada.

In 2022, after the 2022 Quebec general election, the PQ and its leader Paul St-Pierre Plamondon said that they would not take the Oath of Allegiance upon taking their seats in the National Assembly of Quebec, with Plamondon arguing that "you can’t serve two masters at the same time." On 19 October 2022, the 11 Québec Solidaire MNAs announced they also did not wish to swear the Oath of Allegiance.

In response, the President of the Quebec National Assembly François Paradis indicated that PQ and Québec Solidaire MNAs were required to swear the Oath of Allegiance or risk expulsion from the legislature. While QS members eventually did swear allegiance, on 1 December 2022, PQ MNAs were stopped from entering the legislature following their continued opposition to the Oath of Allegiance. In response, the Coalition Avenir Québec government of François Legault tabled a bill that would make the Oath of Allegiance optional for MNAs. That bill passed the assembly with unanimous consent on 6 December 2022. It remains unclear if the law has any effect.

Federal

Amendments have also been proposed in the federal scope, though the same difficulty in altering the constitution thwarted any changes, leading members of parliament (MPs) in Ottawa to table various bills that sought to alter the Parliament of Canada Act, instead. While none were ever successful, certain MPs have recited further pledges in the presence of their constituents or added their own pledge after reciting the Oath of Allegiance. In 2005, Senator Raymond Lavigne uttered the words "and to my country, Canada," at the end of the Oath of Allegiance, which raised questions from other senators and Lavigne was instructed to take the oath again, without the amendment. Following this, the Senator proposed that the Senate rules be changed to add an oath to Canada after the oath to the sovereign, in the form of: "I, [name], do swear (or solemnly affirm) that I will be faithful and bear true allegiance to Canada." The motion never passed.

All members of the federal Civil Service were previously required to take the Oath of Allegiance before being officially hired, a stipulation that prompted Pierre Vincent, a civil servant of Acadian descent who refused to swear the oath, to undertake a three-year legal challenge against the Public Service Commission. The latter found that Vincent could keep his job with the Civil Service and, though the Supreme Court ruled that civil servants continued to be employees of the monarch, Royal Assent was granted to the Public Service Modernization Act in 2003, which removed the necessity of the bureaucratic civil servants to take the oath to their employer.

The inclusion of the Oath of Allegiance in the Oath of Citizenship has also met with opposition, though this was never a constitutional matter, instead falling within the scope of the Citizenship Act.

See also
 Oath of allegiance
 Oath of office
 Oath of citizenship

Notes

References

External links
Governor-General's Media Fact Sheet: The Oath
Oaths of Allegiance and the Canadian House of Commons
Oaths of Allegiance Act

Canada
Government of Canada
Monarchy in Canada